Youxian may refer to:

Youxian District, in Mianyang, Sichuan, China
You County, in Hunan, China
Yóuxiān, a class of immortals called Xian in Chinese philosophy.